The 2021 Ambato La Gran Ciudad was a professional tennis tournament played on clay courts. It was the 1st edition of the tournament which was part of the 2021 ATP Challenger Tour. It took place in Ambato, Ecuador between 20 and 26 September 2021.

Singles main-draw entrants

Seeds

 1 Rankings are as of 13 September 2021.

Other entrants
The following players received wildcards into the singles main draw:
  Daniel Espín Pérez
  Diego Hidalgo
  Antonio Cayetano March

The following player received entry into the singles main draw using a protected ranking:
  Gerald Melzer

The following player received entry into the singles main draw as a special exempt:
  Gonzalo Lama

The following players received entry from the qualifying draw:
  Alejandro Gómez
  Patrick Kypson
  Pol Martín Tiffon
  Matías Zukas

The following players received entry as lucky losers:
  Alexis Gautier
  Alejandro González

Champions

Singles

  Thiago Agustín Tirante def.  Juan Pablo Varillas 7–5, 7–5.

Doubles

  Diego Hidalgo /  Cristian Rodríguez def.  Alejandro Gómez /  Thiago Agustín Tirante 6–3, 4–6, [10–3].

References

2021 ATP Challenger Tour
2021 in Ecuadorian sport
September 2021 sports events in South America